Andriy Batsula (born 6 February 1992) is a Ukrainian professional footballer who plays as a left-back for Vorskla Poltava.

Career 
Batsula is the product of the Youth Sportive School FC Kremin Kremenchuk, but in July 2009 he signed a contract with FC Vorskla Poltava.

Batsula's professional career continued, when he was promoted on loan again to FC Kremin Kremenchuk and in January 2014 he went on loan to the Ukrainian First League club FC Tytan Armyansk.

References

External links 

1992 births
Living people
Ukrainian footballers
Association football defenders
Ukrainian expatriate footballers
Expatriate footballers in Belgium
Expatriate footballers in Belarus
Ukrainian expatriate sportspeople in Belgium
Ukrainian expatriate sportspeople in Belarus
Ukrainian Premier League players
FC Vorskla Poltava players
FC Kremin Kremenchuk players
FC Zirka Kropyvnytskyi players
FC Oleksandriya players
K.V. Kortrijk players
FC Dinamo Minsk players
Ukraine youth international footballers
People from Kremenchuk
Sportspeople from Poltava Oblast